Babindol is a village and municipality in the Nitra District in western Slovakia, in the Nitra Region.

History
In historical records the village was first mentioned in 1271.

Geography
The village lies at an altitude of 195 metres and covers an area of 5.414 km².

Ethnicity
The village is approximately 69% Slovak and 31% Magyar.

Facilities
The village has a public library and football pitch.

Genealogical resources

The records for genealogical research are available at the state archive "Statny Archiv in Nitra, Slovakia"

 Roman Catholic church records (births/marriages/deaths): 1749-1895
 Census records 1869 of Babindol are available at the state archive.

See also
 List of municipalities and towns in Slovakia

External links
https://www.webcitation.org/5QjNYnAux?url=http://www.statistics.sk/mosmis/eng/run.html
Surnames of living people in Babindol

Villages and municipalities in Nitra District